The eleventh season of the stop-motion television series Robot Chicken began airing in the United States on Cartoon Network's late night programming block, Adult Swim, on September 7, 2021. Recently, 12 episodes have been released on every week of September 2021, while the rest of the episodes in the season would be released from February 21, 2022 to April 11, 2022.

The eleventh season is the first season of the show not to be produced by Sony Pictures Television.

Episodes

Notes

References

2021 American television seasons
2022 American television seasons
Robot Chicken seasons